Kalpana Nagar is a residential area in Bhopal, Madhya Pradesh. It is one of the major residential areas around the BHEL Township in Bhopal. It is part of the Ward 64 of the Bhopal Municipal Corporation. It was set up in 1982, as an extension of Sonagiri.

Geography 
Kalpana Nagar is located in the eastern part of the city of Bhopal. It is situated close to the Sonagiri area, along the Raisen Road. Other localities adjacent to Kalpana Nagar are Rajat Nagar, Sundar Nagar, Aalam Nagar & Laxmi Nagar

Establishments 
Kalpana Nagar is mainly a residential area. Some of the major establishments include:
 Maharishi Vidya Mandir, Kalpana Nagar
 Sahkari Parisar Residential Complex
 Chamatkari Mahadev Temple
 Purushottam Gaur Swimming Pool
 Kalpana Nagar Park

References

Neighbourhoods in Bhopal